WICO may refer to:

Media
 WICO-FM, a radio station (101.1 FM) licensed to serve Snow Hill, Maryland, United States
 WJKI (AM), a radio station (1320 AM) licensed to serve Salisbury, Maryland, which held the call sign WICO from 1956 to 2018
 WNKZ-FM, a radio station (92.5 FM) licensed to serve Pocomoke City, Maryland, which held the call sign WICO-FM from 2009 to 2017

Other
 Wico Corporation, a manufacturer of joysticks for arcade video games and home use
The West Indian Company (WICO), a former private company now fully owned by the Public Finance Authority of the United States Virgin Islands